The BMW Masters was a golf tournament played annually at Lake Malaren Golf Club, in Luodian, Shanghai, China. The tournament began in 2011 and became a European Tour event in 2012. It was dropped from the European Tour in 2016.

In 2011, the tournament was called the Lake Malaren Shanghai Masters. The event had a small field consisting of 30 top players from the European Tour and the Asian Tour. The winner received US$2 million, the largest first prize in golf, coming from an overall prize fund of $5 million.

In 2012, it became a European Tour event and was renamed the BMW Masters. The field was expanded to 78 players and the purse was increased to US$7 million. From 2013 to 2015, the tournament was part of the European Tour Final Series.

Winners

References

External links
Coverage on the European Tour's official site

Former European Tour events
Golf tournaments in China
Sports competitions in Shanghai
Recurring sporting events established in 2011
Recurring sporting events disestablished in 2015
2011 establishments in China
2015 disestablishments in China